is a railway station on the Ōu Main Line in the city of Yokote, Akita Prefecture,  Japan, operated by JR East.

Lines
Daigo Station is served by the Ōu Main Line, and is located 221.2 km from the terminus of the line at Fukushima Station.

Station layout
The station consists of a single side platform serving a single bi-directional track. The station is unattended.

History
Daigo Station opened on November 15, 1951 as a station on the Japan National Railways (JNR). The station was absorbed into the JR East network upon the privatization of the JNR on April 1, 1987. A new station building was completed in November 2006.

Surrounding area

See also
List of railway stations in Japan

External links

 JR East Station information 

Railway stations in Japan opened in 1951
Railway stations in Akita Prefecture
Ōu Main Line
Yokote, Akita